Cyperus ligularis is a species of sedge that is native to southern parts of North America, Central America and northern parts of South America as well as along the east coast of Africa.

See also 
 List of Cyperus species

References 

ligularis
Plants described in 1759
Flora of Alabama
Flora of Aruba
Flora of the Bahamas
Flora of Belize
Flora of Benin
Flora of Bolivia
Flora of Brazil
Flora of Cameroon
Flora of Colombia
Flora of the Comoros
Flora of the Republic of the Congo
Flora of Costa Rica
Flora of Cuba
Flora of the Dominican Republic
Flora of Ecuador
Flora of El Salvador
Flora of Guatemala
Flora of Equatorial Guinea
Flora of Florida
Flora of Gabon
Flora of the Gambia
Flora of Ghana
Flora of Guinea
Flora of Haiti
Flora of Honduras
Flora of Ivory Coast
Flora of Jamaica
Flora of Liberia
Flora of Louisiana
Flora of Mauritania
Flora of Mexico
Flora of Nicaragua
Flora of Nigeria
Taxa named by Carl Linnaeus
Flora without expected TNC conservation status